A referendum on becoming a republic was held in the Gambia in April 1970. The changes resulted in the creation of the post of President to replace  Elizabeth II as head of state, thus eliminating the post of Governor-General. It was the second referendum on the issue: the first in 1965 failed because the two-thirds majority required was not reached.

This time the referendum produced a "yes" result. The Prime Minister Sir Dawda Jawara was elected the first President by the parliament, replacing Elizabeth II (represented by Governor-General Sir Farimang Mamadi Singateh) as head of state on 24 April 1970.

Result

References

1970 referendums
1970 in the Gambia
1970
Republicanism in the Gambia
The Gambia and the Commonwealth of Nations
Constitutional referendums
Monarchy referendums
April 1970 events in Africa